Jonathan Maberry (born May 18, 1958) is an American suspense author, anthology editor, comic book writer, magazine feature writer, playwright, content creator and writing teacher/lecturer. He was named one of the Today's Top Ten Horror Writers.

Early life
Jonathan Maberry was born in Kensington, Philadelphia, attended Frankford High School, and then went on to Temple University. Growing up in a rough neighborhood, he began learning martial arts at the age of 6.

Career

Author
Maberry's early work featured martial arts as a topic, such as Judo and You (Kendall Hunt 1990), Ultimate Jujutsu (Strider Nolan, 2002) and Ultimate Sparring (Strider Nolan 2003).

In the next phase of his career, he departed from martial arts writing and wrote several books on the folklore and beliefs of the occult and paranormal, including The Vampire Slayers Field Guide to the Undead (Strider Nolan, 2000), written under the pen name of Shane MacDougall; Vampire Universe: The Dark World of Supernatural Beings That Haunt Us, Hunt Us and Hunger for Us (Citadel Press, 2006); The Cryptopedia, co-authored by David F. Kramer (2007); Zombie CSU: The Forensics of the Living Dead (2008); They Bite (also with David F. Kramer, 2009); and Wanted Undead or Alive (with Janice Gable Bashman, 2010). The Cryptopedia won the Bram Stoker Award for best nonfiction work.

His first novel, Ghost Road Blues, won the 2007 Bram Stoker Award for Best First Novel. That book was the first of the Pine Deep Trilogy and was followed by Dead Man's Song (2007) and Bad Moon Rising (2008), all from Pinnacle Books.

Maberry is also a freelance comic book writer, first for Marvel and later for Dark Horse and IDW Publishing. His first story, "Wolverine: Ghosts", was published as a backup story in Wolverine: Anniversary, April 2009. In August 2009 he became the regular writer for Marvel's Black Panther series, starting on the 7th issue, and he wrote Marvel Zombies Return: Wolverine. In 2010, he wrote Doom War and Marvel Universe Vs The Punisher, Marvel Universe Vs Wolverine, Marvel Universe Vs The Avengers; Klaws of the Panther, and Captain America: Hail Hydra. He moved to Dark Horse Comics and produced a single miniseries, Bad Blood, with artist Tyler Crook, which went on to win the Bram Stoker Award for Best Graphic Novel. His work for IDW Publishing includes two collections of V-Wars, a five-issue standalone series Rot & Ruin: Warrior Smart, and his latest series Pandemic.

His bestselling work was the novelization of the 2010 film The Wolfman which starred Benicio del Toro, Anthony Hopkins, Emily Blunt, and Hugo Weaving. In March 2010, the novel reached #35 on the mass-market paperback section of The New York Times Best Seller List. It was nominated for and won the Scribe Award for Best Film Adaptation, issued by the International Association of Media Tie-in Writers.

In 2010 Maberry began writing young adult post-apocalyptic zombie stories. His first prestigious award was for his first young adult novel, Rot & Ruin (2010, Simon & Schuster). It won the 2010 Bram Stoker Award for Best Novel, was named in Booklist's Ten Best Horror Novels for Young Adults, an American Library Association Top Pick, a Bram Stoker and Pennsylvania Keystone to Reading winner; winner of several state Teen Book Awards including the Cricket, Nutmeg and MASL; winner of the Cybils Award, the Eva Perry Mock Printz medal, Dead Letter Best Novel Award, and four Melinda Awards. It became the first of a new series of post-apocalyptic zombie thrillers such as Dust & Decay (winner of a 2011 Bram Stoker Award) Flesh & Bone (winner of a 2012 Bram Stoker Award), Fire & Ash, a collection of short stories, Bits and Pieces, Broken Lands, and Lost Roads, which will be released August 25, 2020.

Maberry then launched a series called The Nightsiders that blends science fiction with horror. Book 1 of that series, The Orphan Army was named as one of the 100 Best Books for Children. A follow-up, Vault of Shadows was published in August 2016.

The series for which Maberry is best known is the Joe Ledger Series, in which a Baltimore police detective is recruited into a Special Ops unit attached to the mysterious Department of Military Sciences, which is run by enigmatic Mr. Church. Each of the books in the series pits Ledger and his team against a different kind of extreme science threat. In the first novel, Patient Zero, the threat is a pathogen that turns people into zombies. In the second book, The Dragon Factory, the villains are geneticists using cutting-edge science to restart the Nazi master race eugenics program. The rest of the series follows with The King of Plagues, Assassin’s Code, Extinction Machine, Code Zero, Predator One, Kill Switch, Dogs of War; and Deep Silence. Maberry recently launched Rage, the first in the follow-up Rogue Team International series, also featuring Joe Ledger.  A collection of Maberry's Joe Ledger short stories, Joe Ledger: Special Ops, was released by JournalStone. The series' main publisher, Griffin, released Joe Ledger: Unstoppable, an anthology of Ledger stories written by a variety of top suspense and mystery writers including Tim Lebbon, Scott Sigler, Steve Alten, Weston Ochse, Dana Fredsti, Christopher Golden, Joe McKinney, Jeremy Robinson, Javier Grillo-Marxuach, Sherrilyn Kenyon, Bryan Thomas-Schmidt, and others.

In 2015 Maberry released a rare standalone novel, Ghostwalkers, based on the Deadlands table top role playing game. The book was nominated for a Scribe Award for best original novel based on a licensed property.

His most recent standalone novel was Glimpse, published in March 2018 by St. Martin's Press. Glimpse is a chilling thriller that explores what happens when reality and nightmares converge, and how far one will go to protect the innocent when their own brain is a threat. Another standalone, Ink, will be released by St. Martin's Griffin as a trade paperback in 2020. Although a standalone, Ink has elements of other books, including characters and locations from the Pine Deep Trilogy, and the appearance of Monk Addison and Patty Cakes from Glimpse.

Maberry is also a prolific editor of anthologies in a variety of genre including dark fantasy (Out of Tune and Out of Tune Vol 2), science fiction/horror (The X-Files: Trust No One, The X-Files: The Truth is Out There, and  The X-Files: Secret Agendas, all from IDW Publishing); horror (Nights of the Living Dead, with George A. Romero); mystery pastiche (Alternate Sherlocks, with Michael Ventrella), political thrillers with horror (V-wars, V-Wars: Blood and Fire, V-Wars: Night Terrors, and V-Wars: Shockwaves), and an anthology of horror stories for teens (Scary Out There) which features original stories and poetry by R.L. Stine, Ellen Hopkins, Linda Addision, Ilsa J. Bick, and many others.

In 2017 he published Devil’s Advocate, one of the first two books in the X-Files Origins series. Maberry wrote the story about a young Dana Scully, while colleague Kami Garcia (Beautiful Creatures), wrote Agent of Chaos, a young Fox Mulder story.

Also in 2017, Maberry published Indigo, a collaborative work of fiction written with nine other authors including Charlaine Harris and Christopher Golden.

Film and television
In May 2010, Maberry's work was the basis of a television pilot written by Javier Grillo-Marxuach named "Department Zero", which was moved into active production by ABC Television.

In April 2018, it was announced that Netflix greenlit a television adaptation of the V-WARS novels and comics.  Following the series announcement, it was confirmed that Maberry would be credited as an executive producer and creator for the Netflix series V Wars. Production for the first season began and ended in 2018 for a 10-episode first season. The series premiered on December 5, 2019.

Other work
Maberry is a speaker for the National Writers Union, a writing mentor for the Horror Writers Association and the Mystery Writers of America, a member of the International Thriller Writers and president of the NJ-PA Chapter of the Horror Writers Association.

Maberry is also a contributing editor for The Big Thrill, the monthly newsletter of the International Thriller Writers, and a founding partner of The Liars Club, a networking group of professionals in publishing and other aspects of entertainment.

Personal life
Maberry holds an 8th degree black belt in Shinowara-ryu Jujutsu.  In 2004 he was inducted into the Martial Arts Hall of Fame.

Awards
 2003, Writer's Award, International Martial Arts Hall of Fame
 2004, Martial Arts Hall of Fame (USA)
 2006, winner: Bram Stoker Award for Best First Novel, for Ghost Road Blues
 2006, nominated: Bram Stoker Award for Novel, for Ghost Road Blues
 2007, winner: Bram Stoker Award for Best Non-Fiction for The Cryptopedia
 2008, nominated: Bram Stoker Award for Best Non-Fiction for Zombie CSU
 2009, nominated: Bram Stoker Award for Novel, for Patient Zero
 2010, winner: Bram Stoker Award for Best Novel, for Rot & Ruin
 2010, nominated: Bram Stoker Award for Best Non-Fiction, for Wanted Undead or Alive
 2011, winner (tie): Bram Stoker Award for Young Adult Novel, for Dust and Decay
 2011, nominated: Bram Stoker Award for Best Graphic Novel, for Marvel Universe vs. Wolverine
 2012, winner: Bram Stoker Award for Best Young Adult Novel, for Flesh & Bone
 2014, winner: Bram Stoker Award for Best Graphic Novel, for Bad Blood

Bibliography

Stand-alone novels 
The Wolfman Movie Novelization (2010, Tor Books) – 
Deadlands: Ghostwalkers (October 2010, Tor Books)
Mars One (2016, Simon & Schuster)
Indigo (2017, St. Martin's Press) – 
Glimpse (2018, St. Martin's Griffin) –

Night Universe

Pine Deep Trilogy 
Ghost Road Blues (June 2006, Pinnacle Books) – 
Dead Man's Song (July 2007, Pinnacle Books) – 
Bad Moon Rising (May 2008, Pinnacle Books) – 
Monk Addison:
Ink (2020, St. Martin's Griffin) –

Rot & Ruin series 
Rot & Ruin (September 2010, Simon & Schuster)
Dust & Decay (August 2011, Simon & Schuster
Flesh & Bone (September 2012, Simon & Schuster
Fire & Ash (September 2013, Simon & Schuster) (finale)
Bits & Pieces (September 2015, Simon & Schuster) (short story collection)
Broken Lands series:
Broken Lands – Broken Lands #1/Rot & Ruin #6 (December 2018, Simon & Schuster)
Lost Roads – Broken Lands #2/Rot & Ruin #7 (August 2020, Simon & Schuster)

Joe Ledger series 
 Patient Zero (March 2009, St. Martin's Griffin)
 The Dragon Factory (March 2010, St. Martin's Griffin)
 The King of Plagues (March 2011, St. Martin's Griffin)
 Assassin's Code (April 2012, St. Martin's Griffin)
 The Extinction Machine (March 2013, St. Martin's Griffin)
 Code Zero (March 2014, St. Martin's Griffin)
 Predator One (March 2015, St. Martin's Griffin)
 Kill Switch (April 2016, St. Martin's Griffin)
 Dogs of War (2017, St. Martin's Griffin)
 Deep Silence (October 2018, St. Martin's Griffin)
Joe Ledger – Rogue Team International
 Rage (November 2019, St. Martin's Griffin)
Relentless (July 2021, St. Martin's Griffin)

Dead of Night series 
Dead of Night (2011, St. Martin's Griffin) – 
Fall of Night (2014, St. Martin's Griffin) – 
Dark of Night (2016, JournalStone) (novella)
Still of Night (2018, JournalStone) –

The Nightsiders 
The Nightsiders: The Orphan Army (2015, Simon & Schuster Books for Young Readers)
The Nightsiders: Vault of Shadows (2016, Simon & Schuster Books for Young Readers)

X-Files Origins 
Devil's Advocate (2017, Imprint/Macmillan)

Kagen the Damned 
Kagen the Damned (May 2022, St. Martin's Griffin) – 
"I Say Your Name in the Dark Nights" (short story) (November 2022, St. Martin's Griffin) - ISBN 9781250887658
Son of the Poison Rose (January 2023, St. Martin's Griffin) - ISBN 9781250783998

Anthologies and collections

V-Wars: Chronicles of the Vampire Wars 
V-Wars (editor and principal writer – 2012, IDW Publishing)
V-Wars: Blood and Fire (editor and principal writer – 2014, IDW Publishing)
V-Wars: Night Terrors (editor and principal writer – 2016, IDW Publishing)
V-Wars: Shockwaves (editor and principal writer – 2016, IDW Publishing)

Others

Anthology editor 

Out of Tune Vol 1 (2014, JournalStone Publishing)
Out of Tune Vol 2 (2016, JournalStone Publishing)
X-Files: Trust No One (2015, IDW Publishing)
X-Files: The Truth is Out There (2016, IDW Publishing)
X-Files: Secret Agenda (2016, IDW Publishing)
Scary Out There (2016, Simon & Schuster)
Joe Ledger: Unstoppable (2017, Simon & Schuster) (with Bryan Thomas-Schmidt)
Baker Street Irregulars (2017, Diversion Books) (with Michael Ventrella)
Nights of the Living Dead (2017, St. Martin's Griffin) (with George A. Romero)
Hardboiled Horror (2017, JournalStone Publishing)
The Baker Street Irregulars: The Game's Afoot (2018, Diversion Books) (with Michael Ventrella)
Aliens: Bug Hunt (2018, Titan Books)
New Scary Stories to Tell in the Dark (2019, HarperCollins)
Don't Turn Out the Lights (2020, Harper Collins)
Aliens vs Predator: Ultimate Prey (2022, Titan Books)

Nonfiction
Judo and You: A Handbook for the Serious Student (1991, Kendall Hunt) – 
Self-Defense for Every Woman (1992, Vortex Multimedia)
Shinowara-ryo Jujutsu: A History  (1993, Vortex Multimedia)
Introduction to Asian Martial Arts (1993, Vortex Multimedia)
Shinowara-ryo Jujutsu: Student Handbook (1994, Vortex Multimedia)
The Martial Arts Student Log Book (October 2002)
Ultimate Jujutsu: Principles and Practices (October 2002)
Ultimate Sparring: Principles & Practices (January 2003)
The Vampire Slayers' Field Guide to the Undead (2003, Strider Nolan Publishing) (as Shane MacDougall) – 
Vampire Universe: The Dark World of Supernatural Beings That Haunt Us, Hunt Us and Hunger for Us (September 2006)
The Cryptopedia: A Dictionary of the Weird, Strange, and Downright Bizarre (September 2007)
Zombie CSU: The Forensics of the Living Dead (September 2008)
THEY BITE!: Endless Cravings of Supernatural Predators (August 2008)
Wanted Undead or Alive: Vampire Hunters and Other Kick-Ass Enemies of Evil (September 2010)
The Joe Ledger Companion (2017, JournalStone) (with Dana Fredsti & Mari Adkins)

Comics
Marvel Universe vs. The Punisher (with Goran Parlov, 4-issue limited series, Marvel Comics, October–November 2010, tpb, 112 pages, hardcover, January 2011, softcover, June 2011)
Marvel Universe vs. Wolverine (with Laurence Campbell, 4-issue limited series, Marvel Comics, June–August 2011, tpb, 112 pages, hardcover, November 2011, softcover, May 2012)
Marvel Universe vs. The Avengers (with Leandro Fernández, 4-issue limited series, Marvel Comics, December 2012 – March 2013, tpb, 96 pages, softcover, April 2013)
Rot & Ruin (with Tony Vargas and Alex Roland, continuing series, IDW Publishing, September 2014 – Current)
Captain America: Hail Hydra (Marvel Entertainment, 2011)
Klaws of the Panther (Marvel Entertainment, 2011)
Black Panther: DoomWar (Marvel Entertainment, 2009)
Black Panther: Power (Marvel Comics, 2009)
Marvel Zombies Return, Issue 3 (Marvel Comics, 2009)
Punisher: Naked Kills (Marvel Comics, 2008)
Black Panther: Age of Heroes (Marvel Comics, 2011)
Wolverine: Flies to a Spider (Marvel Comics, 2009)
Bad Blood Dark Horse Comics, 2014)
V-Wars: Crimson Queen (IDW Publishing, 2014)V-Wars: All of Us Monsters (IDW Publishing, 2015)V-Wars: Gods of Death (IDW Publishing, 2019) V-Wars: The Complete Collection (IDW Publishing, 2019)Road of the Dead: Highway to Hell, Issues 1-3 (IDW Publishing, 2018–2019)Road of the Dead: Highway to Hell, Graphic Novel,  (IDW Publishing, 2019)Pandemica, Issues 1-3 (IDW Publishing, 2019)Pandemica, Graphic Novel Collection (IDW Publishing, June 2020)

AudiobooksLullaby, Narrated by Scott Brick, Audible Original, (Audible Studios 2018)Bewilderness, Part One: Threshold, Narrated by Shayna Small, Audible Original, (Audible Studios December 2020)Bewilderness, Part Two: What Rough Beast, Narrated by Shayna Small, Audible Original, (Audible Studios January 2021)Bewilderness, Part Three: Destroyer of Worlds'', Narrated by Shayna Small, Audible Original, (Audible Studios February 2021)

References

External links

Zombie Research Society Advisory Board
Interview with Michael A. Ventrella
Interview with Super Hero Speak
IDW Publishing
Marvel Entertainment
Marvel Comics 
Dark Horse Comics 
JournalStone Publishing 
Diversion Press
Simon & Schuster
Simon & Schuster Books for Young Readers
Blackstone Audio
St. Martin's Griffin
Tor Books
Pinnacle Books

American comics writers
American horror writers
American martial arts writers
1958 births
Living people
American male novelists